The Independent Ecological Alliance was a French electoral coalition originally created to participate in the 2009 European elections composed of the Independent Ecological Movement, Ecology Generation, and France in Action.

2009 European elections
East: Antoine Waechter
Île-de-France: Jean-Marc Governatori
Massif Central: Michel Fabre
North-West: Bernard Frau
Overseas: Amandine Dalmasso
South-East: Francis Lalanne
South-West: Patrice Drevet
West: Eva Roy

The coalition won 3.63% of the vote nationally and won no seats/

2010 Regional elections
The Independent Ecological Alliance (AEI), after winning 3.6% in the European elections, is running independent lists in 10 regions. The AEI signed electoral deals with Europe Écologie in Alsace and Midi-Pyrénées, with the MoDem in Auvergne, Franche-Comté, Pays de la Loire and Poitou-Charentes.

References

External links
 Official site

Defunct political party alliances in France
Green political parties in France
Political parties established in 2009
Political parties disestablished in 2021
Political parties of the French Fifth Republic